Mankundu is a locality in Bhadreswar Municipality of Hooghly district in the Indian state of West Bengal. It is a part of the area covered by Kolkata Metropolitan Development Authority (KMDA).

Etymology
The name Mankundu comes from a prehistoric era when King Man Singh sent a few soldiers to defeat the then mog dacoits in 17th era.

Geography
Mankundu is situated in Latitude: 22°84'N & Longitude: 88°34'E.

Transport
State Highway 6/ Grand Trunk Road passes through Mankundu. Private Bus number 2 (Chunchura Court - Dakshineswar) plies through here.

Mankundu railway station is on the Howrah-Bardhaman main line. It is part of Kolkata Suburban Railway system.

Education
Pearl Rosary School is the most renowned school in the locality. The school is affiliated to WBBSE and WBCHSE. The school is an authorised study centre of National Institute of Open Schooling (NIOS), Govt of India.

Sir J. C. Bose School of Engineering, an engineering college, was established at Mankundu in 2009.

Mankundu B.Ed. College, was established at Mankundu in 2011.

Vivekananda Wisdom Mission School, was established at Mankundu in 2011.

Techno India Group Public School, Mankundu

Pearl Rosary School, affiliated to WBBSE and WBCHSE. The school is also an authorised study centre of National Institute of Open Schooling (NIOS), Govt of India.

References

Cities and towns in Hooghly district
Neighbourhoods in Kolkata
Kolkata Metropolitan Area